Glomerella may refer to:
 Glomerella (fungus), a synonym for Colletotrichum, a fungal genus
 Glomerella (beetle), a ladybird genus in the tribe Sticholotidini